Tateyamaria pelophila is a Gram-negative, facultatively anaerobic and motile bacterium from the genus of Tateyamaria which has been isolated from tidal flat sediments from the North Sea Coast from Germany.

References 

Rhodobacteraceae
Bacteria described in 2010